Nabbingo is a hill in Wakiso District in the Buganda Region of Uganda. The name "Nabbingo", also applies to the village that occupies the hill and the schools and churches that are located there.

Location
Nabbingo is one of the villages in Nabbingo Parish, Nsangi sub-county, in Busiro County, in Wakiso District. The geographical coordinates of Nabbingo are: 0°17'24.0"N, 32°28'41.0"E (Latitude:0.290000; Longitude:32.478056).

Points of interest
The most prominent points of interest in Nabbingo are the Roman Catholic Church at the Top of the hill and Trinity College Nabbingo, established by the White Fathers in 1942. The Nabbingo Catholic Parish Church is administered under the Roman Catholic Archdiocese of Kampala.

Closer to the Masaka Highway, there are a couple of Pentecostal churches, an internet cafe, a hardware store and a couple of motels.

See also
 Nsangi
 Buddo
 Kyengera

References

External links
 Villages in Nabbingo Parish, Nsangi sub-county, Busiro County, Wakiso District, Central Uganda

Populated places in Central Region, Uganda
Cities in the Great Rift Valley
Wakiso District